The Men's 100 meter Race at the IPC Athletics Asia-Oceania Championship 2016 was held at the Dubai Police Club Stadium in Dubai from 7–12 March.

Results
Legend

AS: Asian Record

WR: World Record

PB: Personal Best

SB: Season Best

Fn-False Start

Q- Qualified for Finals

q- Qualified for Finals as per best performance

DNF- Did Not Finish

DSQ- Disqualified

T11

Final

Date- 10:March:2016

Time- 17:22

T12

Final

Date- 10:March:2016

Time- 17:34

T37

Final 

Date- 08:March:2016

Time- 18:20

T47

Final 

Date- 08:March:2016

Time- 18:42

T54

Final 

Date- 08:March:2016

Time- 16:42

References 

IPC Athletics Asia-Oceania Championship 2016